George Stuckey (6 July 1871 – 15 March 1932) was an Australian rules footballer who played with and captained the Essendon Football Club in the Victorian Football League (VFL).

Family
His brother, Harry, was also a prominent cricket player for Victoria.

Football
Stuckey played as both a wingman and half back during his career in the VFA and VFL and was the first captain of Essendon in the VFL; and, when Essendon won the (inaugural) VFL premiership in 1897, he also became the first VFL premiership captain. He remained captain until the end of the 1900 season and was a premiership player again in 1901. During his career he represented Victoria at interstate football.

Cricket
A talented sportsman, in addition to his football career, Stuckey also played first class cricket for Victoria.

Athlete
In 1897 (the year he captained Essendon to its first VFL premiership) he won the 130-yard Stawell Gift, in 12.2 seconds, off a handicap of 12 yards.

Honours
In 2010 Stuckey was inducted into the Essendon Hall of Fame.

See also
 List of Victoria first-class cricketers
 The Footballers' Alphabet

Notes

References
 'Follower', "The Footballers' Alphabet", The Leader, (Saturday, 23 July 1898), p.17.
 Maplestone, M., Flying Higher: History of the Essendon Football Club 1872–1996, Essendon Football Club, (Melbourne), 1996.

External links

 
 Profile at Essendonfc.com
 Cricinfo profile

1871 births
Australian rules footballers from Victoria (Australia)
Essendon Football Club players
Essendon Football Club Premiership players
Essendon Association Football Club players
Victoria cricketers
Stawell Gift winners
1932 deaths
Two-time VFL/AFL Premiership players
Cricketers from Victoria (Australia)